El Sentinel, also known as El Sentinel de Orlando, is a weekly Spanish-language newspaper published in Orlando, Florida by Tribune Publishing. It is a sister paper to the Orlando Sentinel and caters to Central Florida's Hispanic communities, discussing news, entertainment, and sports.

The paper is published on Saturdays. It can be found at local distribution points or included with a subscription to the Orlando Sentinel at no additional cost.

It was announced the paper will cease publication on Dec. 3, 2022.

References

External links

Newspapers published in Florida
Mass media in Orlando, Florida
Spanish-language newspapers published in Florida
Tribune Publishing